The Balima River may refer to:

Balima River (Papua New Guinea)
Balima River (Democratic Republic of the Congo)